Dravidan is a 1989 Indian Tamil-language action film directed by R. Krishnamoorthy, starring Sathyaraj, Vidhyashree and Suparna Anand. It is a remake of the 1988 Malayalam film Aryan. The film was released on 28 October 1989, Diwali day.

Plot

Cast 
Sathyaraj
Vidhyashree
Ambika
Suparna Anand
Jaishankar
Sharat Saxena
Jai Ganesh
Goga Kapoor
Nalinikanth
Hareesh
Monisha Unni
Nizhalgal Ravi
S. S. Chandran
Somayajulu
Vijayakumar
Vinu Chakravarthy
Rajyalakshmi
Devilalitha
Srividya

Soundtrack 
The music was composed by M. S. Viswanathan, with lyrics by Pulamaipithan.

Release and reception 
Dravidan was released on 28 October 1989, Diwali day, alongside another Sathyaraj film Vaathiyaar Veettu Pillai. P. S. S. of Kalki praised the performances of the cast.

References

External links 
 

1980s Tamil-language films
1989 action films
1989 films
Films directed by R. Krishnamoorthy
Films scored by M. S. Viswanathan
Indian action films
Tamil remakes of Malayalam films